Kofi Mensah (born 26 December 1996) is a Ghanaian professional footballer who plays as goalkeeper for Ashanti Gold on loan from Karela United. Mensah previously played for Ghanaian club Tema Youth, Cape Coast Ebusua Dwarfs and Karela United He also featured for Zambian club Power Dynamos.

Career 
Mensah played for Karela United, where he helped them to win the Ghana Division One League Zone III in 2017 and gain promotion to the Ghana Premier League for the first time in the club's history. He also played a major part in their 2019 GFA Normalization Special Competition campaign as they went to through to the final before losing to Asante Kotoko in the Championship playoff final.

Mensah played for Zambia Super League club Power Dynamos from January 2020 to February 2021. In February 2021, he signed a three-year deal with Obuasi-based club Ashanti Gold.

Honours 
Karela United

 Ghana Division One League Zone II: 2017

References

External links 

 
 
 

Living people
1996 births
Association football goalkeepers
Tema Youth players
Ebusua Dwarfs players
Karela United FC players
Power Dynamos F.C. players
Ghanaian expatriate footballers
Zambia Super League players
Ghanaian expatriate sportspeople in Zambia
Expatriate footballers in Zambia
Ghanaian footballers